Constituent Assembly elections were held in the Democratic Republic of Georgia between 14 and 16 February 1919. The electoral system used was party-list proportional representation using the D'Hondt method in a single nationwide district. The result was a victory for the Social Democratic Labour Party of Georgia, which won 81% of the vote, and 109 of the 130 seats. In by-elections held in spring, they lost four seats and the Armenian Party in Georgia–Dashnaktsitiuni and the Georgian National Party both won seats.

Following the election, the Constituent Assembly approved and ratified the Act of Independence on 12 March.

Results

References

Parliamentary elections in Georgia (country)
Georgia
Modern history of Georgia (country)
1919 in Georgia (country)